Saša Ćurko (born 12 June 1996) is a Serbian football forward who plays for Cement Beočin.

Personal life
Saša is a son of a former goalkeeper Goran Ćurko.

Club career

Vojvodina
He made his Jelen SuperLiga debut for Vojvodina on 25 May 2014 in 2:0 away win against Napredak Kruševac.

Honours
Vojvodina
 Serbian Cup: 2013–14
Proleter
 Serbian First League: 2017–18

References

External links

1996 births
Living people
Association football forwards
Serbian footballers
FK Vojvodina players
Serbian SuperLiga players
FK Cement Beočin players